OFC Elin Pelin is a Bulgarian football club based in the town of Elin Pelin, Sofia Province. It was founded in 1923 as Levski Elin Pelin.

References 

Football clubs in Bulgaria
1923 establishments in Bulgaria
Association football clubs established in 1923
Sport in Sofia Province